Hemiandra gardneri, commonly known as red snakebush, is a flowering plant in the family Lamiaceae and is endemic to Western Australia. It is a prostrate, trailing plant with greyish foliage and mostly red flowers.

Description
The red to dark pink flowers are borne usually  in clusters near the end of stems. Flowering occurs from August to October.

Taxonomy and naming
Hemiandra gardneri was first formally described in 1927 by Oswald Hewlett Sargent and the description was published in Journal of Botany, British and Foreign.The specific epithet (gardneri) is in honour of  Charles Gardner.

Distribution and habitat
Red snakebush grows on deep sand in heath, scrub and hills north of Watheroo.

Conservation status
Hemiandra gardneri is listed as "endangered" under the Environment Protection and Biodiversity Conservation Act 1999.

References

Eudicots of Western Australia
Lamiaceae
Lamiales of Australia
Plants described in 1927